is a fictional character and the main protagonist of the manga series Haikyu!! created by Haruichi Furudate. Shoyo is a high school student who wishes to become like the "Little Giant," a former Karasuno High School student and volleyball club member. To achieve his dream, he decides to join Karasuno, but to join the volleyball team he and Tobio Kageyama, a previous volleyball match opponent, must overcome their rivalry and work together.

In the Haikyu!! anime adaptation, he is voiced by Ayumu Murase in Japanese and Bryson Baugus in English.

Concept and creation
In the one shot of Haikyu!!!, Kageyama was the protagonist and Hinata his teammate. However, in the manga, Furudate chose a short boy as the main character in order to draw a shonen manga. In an interview with Yomiuri Shimbun, Furudate stated that the development of Hinata dropping out of a major game because he had a fever was decided early on to show that Hinata could not survive only with his impulses in order to compete in the nationals and believed that this could convince the reader. In addition, on the podcast Haikyu!! Karasuno High School Broadcasting Club! podcast, Furudate revealed that Hinata was originally more impetuous than Ryunosuke Tanaka, and also commented that he preferred to give Tanaka that personality.

His voice actor, Ayumu Murase, commented to Kageyama's actor, Kaito Ishikawa, that when he took on the role of Hinata he did not have as many job opportunities as he does now, and he worked hard to play it. Murase also said that the response after the broadcast of the anime was excellent and, as a result of being recognized not only by viewers but also by the people involved in the production, the number of job proposals increased.

Appearances

Haikyu!!
Aspiring to be a volleyball player, Hinata longs to be like the "Small Giant", a short Karasuno student who was a volleyball player. Although he started playing volleyball in middle school, the volleyball team did not have that many members and was considered a fan club, and he was unable to practice properly. The first official match of the school he attended was his last, where he played against Kitagawa Daiichi, where Kageyama attended. In order to win a match, he attends Karasuno High School, where the "Small Giant" studied. There, he discovers that Kageyama studies at the same high school, they fight and refuse to join the club. When the two manage to make peace, four people, including Yamaguchi and Tsukishima, join the club. After graduating from high school, he decided to go to Brazil alone to play beach volleyball. After a three-year stint in the country, he returns to Japan and participates in a match as a player for MSBY Black Jackal in the top division of the V League.

Video games
In the video game, Puyopuyo!! Quest, two collaborations were made with Haikyu!!, Hinata appeared as a guest in both. In the first release, his own card was implemented. In addition, in the second collaboration with the game, a scenario based on Haikyu!! To the Top was developed.

Theater
In the theatrical version of Haikyu!!, Kenta Suga played the role of Hinata from 2015 to 2018, and Kotaro Daigo has been playing it since November 2019. Daigo cites the original Hinata as his rival, "because he is a person who respects and wants to surpass his positive personality, his unwavering attitude and his ability to grow hard."

Reception
Ryoko Fukuda, of Real Sound, commented that "the positive attitude and physical strength in Hinata, not everyone can have it. That's what a shonēn hero has," and added "the reason of becoming stronger for what he likes and striving fervently arouses the reader's desire to support him." In an Anime! Anime! popularity poll, Hinata was voted as the first-most-popular character in Haikyu!!. 

The volleyball player Yuji Nishida revealed in an interview with sports magazine Sportiva that foreign players had told him "You are Hinata." As a volleyball player, he talks about Hinata's small physique and great jumping ability. However, Nishida himself expresses that it is a combination of all the characters.

At the 5th Crunchyroll Anime Awards, Shoyo was nominated for the award for Best Protagonist and won the award for Best Boy.

References

Comics characters introduced in 2012
Crunchyroll Anime Awards winners
Fictional Japanese people in anime and manga
Fictional male sportspeople
Fictional volleyball players
Haikyu!!
Male characters in anime and manga
Teenage characters in anime and manga